The Per Brahe Secondary School is a secondary school in Jönköping, Sweden with traditions back to the 17th century. The current building was opened on 18 October 1913.

Since 2007, the school has UN certification.

References

External links

Official website  

Buildings and structures in Jönköping
Secondary schools in Sweden